Mick Galvin is a former Gaelic footballer who played for the Dublin county team and the St Oliver Plunketts club until they were relegated to the Dublin Intermediate Football Championship and then moved to Na Fianna where he won three Dublin Senior Football Championship medals as player and manager. Galvin returned to his former club St Oliver Plunketts/Eoghan Ruadh for the 2009 season. He took over the Plunketts post from Dermot Kelly who retired after leading he led Oliver Plunketts to the 2007 Dublin AFL Division One title and the 2008 Dublin Senior Football Championship final.

Football career
He won an All-Ireland Senior Football Championship medal with Dublin in 1995. He won three National football league medals with Dublin in 1993, 1991 and in 1987.

References

External links
 Wexford struggle to find football manager

Year of birth missing (living people)
Living people
Dublin inter-county Gaelic footballers
Gaelic football managers
St Oliver Plunketts/Eoghan Ruadh Gaelic footballers
Winners of one All-Ireland medal (Gaelic football)
20th-century births